Andra Karpin (born 19 February 1979) is an Estonian former footballer who played as a defender for the Estonia women's national team.

Career
Karpin played in the first ever official match for Estonia, against Lithuania. In total, she played for the Estonia national team 38 times between 1994 and 2006, scoring four goals.

References

1979 births
Living people
Women's association football defenders
Estonian women's footballers
Estonia women's international footballers
Sportspeople from Pärnu